The Gaol Act (4 Geo 4 c 64), sometimes called the Gaol Act 1823, the Gaols Act 1823, the Gaols, etc. (England) Act 1823, the Prison Act 1823, or the Prisons Act 1823, was an Act of the Parliament of the United Kingdom to reform prisons.

Overview
The idea of prison reform was promoted in the early 19th century by Elizabeth Fry and her brother Joseph John Gurney. In particular, Fry was appalled at the conditions in the women's section of Newgate Prison. This Act was introduced and supported by Home Secretary Robert Peel. It introduced regular visits to prisoners by chaplains; provided for the payment of gaolers, who had previously been paid out of fees that the prisoners themselves were required to pay; stated that female and male prisoners should be kept separated as well as requiring the installation of female wardens to guard female prisoners; and prohibited the use of irons and manacles. It also lifted the death penalty from 130 crimes.

The Act was largely ineffective, because there were no inspectors to make sure that it was being followed. The Prisons Act 1835 offered a remedy by providing for the appointment of five paid prison inspectors. This helped to stop the exploitation of prisoners.

See also
English criminal law

Notes and references
John Raithby. The Statutes of the United Kingdom of Great Britain and Ireland. Printed by George Eyre and Andrew Strahan. London. 1824. Volume 9. Pages 249 to 272.

1823 in British law
United Kingdom Acts of Parliament 1823
Penal system in England
1823 in England